Keith Gooch (born August 31, 1959) is a former Canadian football defensive back in the Canadian Football League (CFL). He played for the BC Lions and Edmonton Eskimos. Gooch played college football at Fresno State, where he was a running back.

References

1959 births
Living people
Players of American football from California
American players of Canadian football
American football running backs
Canadian football defensive backs
Fresno State Bulldogs football players
People from Fort Ord, California
BC Lions players
Edmonton Elks players